Taylor Ritzel (born September 4, 1988 in Aurora, Colorado) is an American rower who was part of the United States women's eight team at the 2012 Summer Olympics. The team won an Olympic gold medal.  She has also been part of the women's eight world championship winning team twice, in 2010 and 2011.

Ritzel started rowing at Yale University, from which she graduated in 2010. While at Yale, she won the I Eight event three times at the NCAA Championships (2007, 2008, 2010). Taylor is currently working in Beverly Hills in nonfiction series content acquisition at Netflix.

References 

1988 births
Yale Bulldogs rowers
Yale University alumni
American female rowers
Living people
Sportspeople from Aurora, Colorado
Rowers at the 2012 Summer Olympics
Olympic gold medalists for the United States in rowing
Medalists at the 2012 Summer Olympics
World Rowing Championships medalists for the United States
21st-century American women